Esther Gronenborn (born 1968 in Oldenburg) is a German film director and screenwriter.  Films she wrote and directed include Alaska.de (2000), Adil geht (2005),  (2005), and a segment of 99euro-films (2001).  She has also been a director of the TV series Galileo Mystery.

References

External links

Living people
1968 births
Film people from Lower Saxony
People from Oldenburg (city)
Best Director German Film Award winners